Argyros (from the Greek word for "silver"), Latinized as Argyrus, can refer to:

 Argyros (Byzantine family), prominent Byzantine noble clan
 Argyrus (Catepan of Italy) (died 1068), Byzantine general of Lombard origin
 Isaac Argyros (born 1312), Byzantine mathematician
 Billy Argyros, Greek-Australian professional poker player
 George Argyros (born 1937), Greek-American ambassador and businessman
 The fictional character Basil Argyros

See also 
 Argyropoulos

Greek-language surnames